Baby Varghese, born in India, is a Malankara Orthodox priest and a Church historian and scholar in Syriac Liturgical Theology.

Education 
After graduating from CMS College in Kottayam, Varghese joined Orthodox Theological Seminary in Kottayam. He earned his bachelor's degree in divinity from Serampore University with first class and first rank. In 1981, he earned his doctorate of theology from the Catholic University of Paris. Four years later he earned his Ph.D. in liturgical studies at the University of Paris - Sorbonne in 1985 Varghese has also earned a Syriac diploma from École pratique des hautes études.

Career 
Varghese is a professor of Theology at St. Thomas Orthodox Theological Seminary, Nagpur, a professor emeritus at Orthodox Theological Seminary, Kottayam, and a professor of Syriac studies at St. Ephrem Ecumenical Research Institute (SEERI). He is a research guide in Syriac studies at Mahatma Gandhi University. Baby Varghese is a priest of the Malankara Orthodox Syrian Church (Indian Orthodox Church) and serves in the Kottayam Orthodox diocese. He has written various books regarding West Syriac Christianity and translated many commentaries of the early Church fathers, Orthodox prayers, and sacraments of the Church.

Malankara Orthodox Syrian Church publications 
There are numerous efforts performed by Baby Varghese in the field of translating books from Syriac to English. Under the authority of the Malankara Orthodox Church Publications (MOC Publications) and with the blessings of the MOC Publications President, Thomas Mar Athanasius, Varghese has translated the Order of the Prayers on Good Friday book,  Prayers of the Great Lent, Prayers of the Holy Week, and the Promioun - Sedro of the Holy Week.

In the Promioun - Sedro of the Holy Week, Athanasius' preface message praised Varghese saying:

Malankara Orthodox Syrian delegation 
In 2009, Varghese participated in the Joint Commission for Dialogue between the Catholic Church and the Malankara Orthodox Syrian Church. The delegation of the Malankara Church consisted of: Metropolitan Gabriel Mar Gregorios (co-chair), Metropolitan Thomas Mar Athanasius; Baby Varghese; Johns Abraham Konat;  Sabu Kuriakose; Abraham Thomas; Fr. O. Thomas and John Mathews (co-secretary).

Varghese presented some reflections on the Anointing of the Sick and its administration to those outside the Orthodox belief.

Awards 
Varghese is a recipient of the:

 Alexander Von Humboldt Fellowship (Free University in Berlin)
 Burke Fellowship (Union Theological Seminary)
 ISM Fellowship and Visiting Professor (Yale University)

Works 
Baby Varghese has published books, commentaries and translation through SEERI and Gorgias Press. Some of his more popular works are included below.

 Varghese, B. (1989). Les onctions baptismales dans la tradition syrienne. Belgium: Universitatis Catholicae Americae.
 Varghese, B. (2004). West Syrian Liturgical Theology. United Kingdom: Ashgate.
 Varghese, B. (2009). The Syriac Version of the Liturgy of St James: A Brief History for Students. United States: Gorgias Press, LLC.
 The Commentary of Dionysius Bar Salibi on the Eucharist. (2011). United States: Gorgias Press, LLC.
 Varghese, B. (2012). Baptism and Chrismation in the Syriac Tradition. United States: Gorgias Press LLC.
 The Commentary of John of Dara on the Eucharist (Moran Etho).
 Varghese, B. (2020). George, Bishop of the Arabs: Homily on the Consecration of Myron: Gorgias Press, LLC.

References

External links 
Fr. Baby Varghese's public blog

Malankara Orthodox Syrian Church
Malankara Orthodox Syrian Church Christians
Indian Christian theologians
Syriac Christianity
Syrian writers
Indian Oriental Orthodox Christians
21st-century Oriental Orthodox Christians
Living people
Liturgists
Institut Catholique de Paris alumni
Paris-Sorbonne University alumni
Syriacists
Patristic scholars
Indian scholars
Year of birth missing (living people)